Sudhinam is a 1994 Malayalam film written by Babu Janardhanan and directed by Nissar.

Cast
 Jayaram as Sahadevan, School Teacher
 Dileep as Raghu
 Madhavi as Vinodini, School Teacher
 Oduvil Unnikrishnan as Raghava Pothuval
 Sudheesh as Appu (T J Appukuttan Nair)
 Aranmula Ponnamma as Bhargavi Amma
 Zainuddin as Shekharan
 Swapna Ravi as Gouri Shekharan
 Mamukkoya as School Teacher
 Suvarna Mathew as Anila
 Mahesh as School Manager
 Sudhakaran Nair as Registrar
 Usharani as School Teacher
 Kozhikode Narayanan Nair as Vinodini's father
 Priyanka as School Teacher

Production
Dileep was supposed to play Sudheesh's role since Sudheesh did not show up to set initially. After Dileep got emotional, the director gave Dileep another character and gave him more lines.

References

External links
 

1994 films
1990s Malayalam-language films
Films directed by Nissar